The Temagami Magnetic Anomaly, also called the Temagami Anomaly or the Wanapitei Anomaly, is a magnetic anomaly resulting from a large buried geologic structure in the Canadian Shield near Temagami, Ontario, Canada. It stretches from Lake Wanapitei in the west to Bear Island in Lake Temagami.

The Aboriginal community of Teme-Augama Anishnabai lies partly within the Temagami Magnetic Anomaly, including the Temagami First Nation on Bear Island. Located nearby are a number of other geological structures, including the Sudbury Basin, the Lake Wanapitei impact crater, and the Temagami Greenstone Belt.

Discovery and structure

The central section has the greatest amplitude and an east-west strike.

The western portion appears smoother in character while the eastern section is long and narrow. With an areal extent of 50 x 15 km, it reaches a magnitude of approximately 10,000 nanoteslas, making it one of the largest positive anomalies in North America. The eastern section coincides with a small positive gravity anomaly, indicating the presence of dense rocks at depth. The anomaly was discovered by a magnetic survey and a gravity survey.

The Temagami Magnetic Anomaly has similarities to the nearby Sudbury Basin, which is one of the richest mining areas in the world, and so it could be a second metal-rich impact crater.

See also
 Maple Mountain (Ontario)
Bangui magnetic anomaly
Kursk Magnetic Anomaly
 Ishpatina Ridge

References

Geology of Temagami
Magnetic anomalies